To constitute India's 15th Lok Sabha, general elections were held in April–May 2009. The results were announced on 16 May 2009. The main contenders were two alliance groups of the Incumbent United Progressive Alliance  and the Opposition National Democratic Alliance; led by Indian National Congress and Bharatiya Janata Party respectively.

This article describes the performance of various political parties. For the performance of individual candidates, please see, List of members of the 15th Lok Sabha.

Results of the 2009 Indian general election by parliamentary constituency.

Results by constituency

See also
Results of the 2004 Indian general election by parliamentary constituency
Results of the 2009 Indian general election by party
Results of the 2009 Indian general election by state

References

2009 Indian general election
Results of general elections in India